Daniel Patrick "Danny" Lafferty (born 18 May 1989) is a Northern Irish professional footballer who plays as a left back for Sligo Rovers.

Career

Early career
Lafferty started his career in the youth team of Oxford United stars before moving on to Celtic in the summer of 2006. In March 2010, joined Scottish First Division side Ayr United on loan until the end of the season. He made his début for the club in a 2–0 win over Morton, also scoring in a 1–1 draw with Dundee. In the summer of 2010, Lafferty was released by Celtic and signed for his hometown club Derry City of the League of Ireland First Division. Lafferty made 12 appearances during the 2010 season as Derry were promoted to the Premier Division as champions. During the 2011 season he spent time on trial at Championship clubs Derby County and Brighton & Hove Albion, but failed to sign a contract.

Burnley
Lafferty signed for EFL Championship side Burnley on 30 January 2012 for an undisclosed fee believed to be in the region of £150,000, after a successful trial. On 2 February 2012 he received International Clearance to play for Burnley and as such was awarded the number 3 shirt at the club which was last worn by Danny Fox. On 18 March 2012 he made his first team debut for the Clarets, starting their away fixture at Cardiff City and playing the full 90 minutes. He received a number of plaudits for his performance including that of Manager Eddie Howe and was voted as Man of the Match on Fan Site Clarets-Mad. Lafferty made his fourth appearance for Burnley in a 4–0 away defeat to Lancashire rivals Blackpool on 21 April 2012, along with four other appearances all coming in away fixtures.

In the 2012–13 season, a number injuries to Burnley defenders saw Lafferty given an extended run of opportunities in the first team and he appeared in over half the league games that season.

In March 2015, Lafferty joined another Championship side Rotherham United on a one-month loan deal. In October 2015, he joined Football League One side Oldham Athletic on a one-month loan along with compatriot Cameron Dummigan. Lafferty scored his first goal for the club in a 1–1 draw against Scunthorpe United on 27 February 2016.

Sheffield United

In August 2016 Lafferty joined Sheffield United on loan. He scored his first goal for the club in a 3-0 win against Shrewsbury Town on 18 October 2016. On 13 January 2017 the left back signed a 2-and-a-half-year deal with the Blades that would keep him on their books until June 2019.

On 3 January 2019, Lafferty joined Peterborough United in a loan deal that would see him stay with the League One side until the end of the 2018–19 season. He was released by Sheffield United at the end of that season.

Shamrock Rovers
Lafferty returned to the League of Ireland in August 2019, joining Shamrock Rovers. He made his debut for the club on 27 August at home versus Waterford.

Lafferty came on as sub during extra time in the 2019 FAI Cup Final in which Rovers went onto to win after beating Dundalk on penalties.  It was the first time the club had won the cup since 1987 and was their 25th cup win.

In 2020 Lafferty was part of the Shams squad who won their record 18th League of Ireland title.  He scored the only goal in a crucial 1-0 win against Bohemians which turned out to be vital in the Hoops title success.

Return to Derry City
On 17 December 2020, it was announced that Lafferty had returned to his hometown club Derry City ahead of the 2021 League of Ireland Premier Division season.
Lafferty was an unused substitute in Derry City's 4-0 win over Shelbourne in the 2022 FAI cup final.

Sligo Rovers
On the 21st of November 2022, it was announced that Lafferty had joined Sligo Rovers on a permanent deal until at least the end of the 2023 season. He would be joining former Shamrock Rovers F.C. teammate Greg Bolger. This was his eighth season in the League Of Ireland.

International career
Lafferty was called up to the Northern Ireland under-17 side in September 2005, making his début in a 1–0 victory over Lithuania in a 2006 UEFA European Under-17 Championship qualifying round match. He went on to make one further appearance in the qualifiers for the under-17 side. He also went on to gain four caps for the under-19 side. He made his début for the under-21 side in August 2008, featuring in a mini-tournament held in Ukraine, playing in defeats to Poland and the hosts. He made his competitive début for the side in September 2008 in the 2009 UEFA European Under-21 Championship qualifier against Germany, which finished in a 3–0 defeat. He also played in a 2011 UEFA European Under-21 Championship qualifier in a defeat to Czech Republic, in what proved to be his final game at that level gaining a total of six caps. He made his début for Northern Ireland B in May 2009, featuring in an inexperienced side that lost 3–0 to Scotland. In May 2012, he won his first call-up to the senior squad for an international friendly against the Netherlands. He made his début in the 6–0 defeat. His competitive international début came in November 2012 in a 2014 FIFA World Cup qualifier against Azerbaijan, which ended in a 1–1 draw.

Following an absence from the national squad, after regained form with Sheffield United, Lafferty was recalled for a 2018 FIFA World Cup qualification match against Norway in March 2017 but was an unused substitute. He was called up again for a World Cup Qualifier against Azerbaijan and a friendly against New Zealand, again Lafferty was an unused substitute in both matches in June 2017. He made the national squad for World Cup qualifiers against San Marino and the Czech Republic in September 2017.

Career statistics

Club

International

Honours

Club
Derry City
League of Ireland Cup: 2011
FAI Cup: 2022

Burnley
Football League Championship runner-up: 2013–14

Sheffield United
EFL League One: 2016–17

Shamrock Rovers
League of Ireland (1): 2020
FAI Cup: 2019

References

External links
 
 NIFG profile
 Irish FA profile

1989 births
Living people
Association footballers from Northern Ireland
Ayr United F.C. players
Celtic F.C. players
Derry City F.C. players
Burnley F.C. players
Rotherham United F.C. players
Oldham Athletic A.F.C. players
Sheffield United F.C. players
Shamrock Rovers F.C. players
Sligo Rovers F.C. players
Scottish Football League players
League of Ireland players
English Football League players
Association football fullbacks
Sportspeople from Derry (city)
Northern Ireland youth international footballers
Northern Ireland under-21 international footballers
League of Ireland XI players
Northern Ireland international footballers
Northern Ireland B international footballers
Premier League players